Dicksonia is a genus of tree ferns in the order Cyatheales. It is regarded as related to Cyathea, but is considered to retain more primitive traits, dating back at least to the Jurassic and Cretaceous periods. The fossil record includes stems, pinnules, and spores.

The genus contains 20–25 species, distributed from Mexico to Argentina, Brazil, Uruguay and Chile, St. Helena, New Zealand, New Caledonia, Australia, Indonesia, New Guinea, and the Philippines. New Guinea has the greatest diversity, with five species.

Species of Dicksonia found in cultivation include:
D. antarctica, soft tree fern
D. fibrosa, woolly tree fern
D. squarrosa, rough or slender tree  fern

The genus was first described by Charles Louis L'Héritier de Brutelle in 1788. The name honors James Dickson, a prominent nurseryman and botanist.

Species 
Plants of the World Online  as of  recognizes the following species:

Species
Phylogeny of Dicksonia

Other species include:
 D. amorosoana Lehnert & Coritico 2018
 D. celebica Lehnert 2018
 D. ceramica Lehnert 2018
 D. externa Skottsberg 1953
 D. lehnertiana Noben et al. 2018
 D. schlechteri Brause 1912
 D. utteridgei Lehnert & Cámara-Leret 2018

References 

 Large, M.F. and J.E. Braggins Tree Ferns. Timber Press, Inc. (2004).
 Lobin, Wolfram. List of the American Dicksonia Species. Scientific Authority of Germany, Bonn 2001.

External links
Community: Care and propagation of Tree ferns (German/English)
Fern Files: Dicksonia
L'Héritier's original diagnosis of the genus online on Project Gutenberg

External links

Dicksoniaceae
Fern genera
Ferns of Africa
Ferns of Oceania
Ferns of the Americas
Jurassic plants
Extant Jurassic first appearances